Víctimas del Pecado (Victims of the Sin) is a 1951 Mexican drama film directed by Emilio Fernández and starring Ninón Sevilla. It was shot at the Churubusco Studios in Mexico City.

Detroit Institute of Arts  considers the film as "one of the most famous post-war Mexican films," and shares that it includes "knockout mambo numbers by Pérez Prado and Pedro Vargas".  The film was also released as Hell's Kitchen.

Plot
Violeta (Ninón Sevilla), a Cuban dancer from the Cabaret Changó, rescues an infant from a garbage can in Mexico City's red-light district. She decides to raise the baby but this displeases Rodolfo (Rodolfo Acosta), the club's owner. Santiago (Tito Junco), a rival club owner, falls in love with Violeta and offers his help. Tragedy takes place when Rodolfo (Rodolfo Acosta) kills Santiago and is then killed by Violeta.

Cast
 Ninón Sevilla as Violeta
 Tito Junco as Santiago
 Rodolfo Acosta as Rodolfo
 Rita Montaner as Rita
 Arturo Soto Rangel as Director de prisión
 Francisco Reiguera as Don Gonzalo
 Lupe Carriles as Doña Longina
 Ismael Pérez as Juanito
 Margarita Ceballos as Rosa

Recognition

Awards and nominations
 1952, Mexican Academy of Film Ariel Awards nomination for Best Cinematography for Gabriel Figueroa
 1952, Mexican Academy of Film Ariel Awards nomination for Best Child Actor for Ismael Pérez

Reception
Twitch Film felt the film would be a perfect match to be double-billed with Josef von Sternberg's Blonde Venus.

Without imagining they were on the verge of securing international fame with the film cabaret series performed by Ninon Sevilla, the Calderon Brothers contracted to Emilio Fernández to direct this musical melodrama that would be more intense and exacerbated that Salón Mexico (1948), the previous raid of "El Indio" into the cabaret environments of the Mexican capital.

As in Salon Mexico, Victimas del Pecado demonstrated the joy of the director in a very particular direct scenes that take place in the cabaret. Also, the director does not hide his love of uplifting moral, nor can he avoid some moments of unintentional comedy as one in which the "Pachuco" Rodolfo Acosta shows his ability to speak more than one language while teaching him how to walk with style to a French prostitute. Despite its considerable shortcomings, Victimas del pecado has kept pace in the filmography of "El Indio" Fernández and the passage of time has not been treated so poorly. Figueroa's photography continues to be splendid and as representative of the filmography of Ninon Sevilla is important to note that the film won an unprecedented success in France and Belgium, where he was known as Quartier interdit (Forbidden Neighborhood or Hell's Kitchen).

Ninon was unsurpassed as the flower that falls in the mud, the star that travels in rotten environments, even though she retains a heart of gold for delivery to a pariah, a hero or a stranger which a past  unknown. Could be brave and help to her man, and betray to the gangster that had knocked on his networks. It could also infatuated with someone of the opposite sex, amazed at her honesty, and the love he feels for his adopted son. All this happens in Victimas del Pecado.

References

Further reading
 Analysis of performances in Víctimas del Pecado.

External links
 Víctimas del Pecado at IMDB

1951 films
Rumberas films
1950s Spanish-language films
1951 drama films
Mexican black-and-white films
Films directed by Emilio Fernández
Mexican drama films
1950s Mexican films